The straight-billed reedhaunter (Limnoctites rectirostris) is a South American bird species in the family Furnariidae.

Taxonomy
Formerly it was placed in Limnornis with the curve-billed reedhaunter (Limnornis curvirostris) which lives in the same general region and habitat, and thus shares some adaptations with L. rectirostris. But L. rectirostris is closer to the typical spinetails (Cranioleuca) than to the curve-billed reedhaunter, and is the sister species of the sulphur-bearded reedhaunter.

Behaviour
As with many of its relatives, rather little is known about its reproductive habits. In southern Uruguay, a juvenile was observed in mid-January (i.e. midsummer).

Distribution and habitat
This bird is found in north-eastern Argentina, south-eastern Brazil and Uruguay. In its range, it is essentially limited to marshy areas in pampas and campos from coastal lowlands to highlands. In Brazil, it is found in Rio Grande do Sul and Santa Catarina States. In Argentina, it occurs in Entre Ríos and the extreme north-east of Buenos Aires Provinces. In Uruguay, it is limited to the eastern and southern part of the country. In recent years, it has been recorded in Cerro Largo, Canelones, Maldonado – where Charles Darwin found it in 1833 at Laguna José Ignacio and Laguna del Diario, where it can still be found –, Rocha, San José and Treinta y Tres Departments (especially at the Quebrada de los Cuervos). From Lavalleja Department, there are only records from 1994, but the bird probably is still found there.

This species prefers marshy and swampy areas between sea level and 1,100 m ASL. A key feature of prime habitat is an abundant growth of caraguata (spiny eryngos, Eryngium spp.), such as E. pandanifolium which it utilizes particularly in upland localities. It is sometimes claimed that the two reedhaunters differ in microhabitat preference, occurring sympatrically in the same region but not within the same locality, but this seems to be incorrect.

Status and conservation
The straight-billed reedhaunter may be common in suitable habitat, but globally its numbers are decreasing and is becoming rare due to habitat loss. Significant threats are pollution and the draining of wetlands, particularly for construction on the outskirts of larger towns. Invasive willows (Salix spp.) as well as plantations of eucalypt (Eucalyptus spp.) and pine (Pinus spp.) are also detrimental to habitat quality. The species occurs in some protected areas, such as Área Protegida Quebrada de los Cuervos in Uruguay's Treinta y Tres Department.

Footnotes

References
 Accordi, Iury Almeida & Barcellos, André (2006): Composição da avifauna em oito áreas úmidas da Bacia Hidrográfica do Lago Guaíba, Rio Grande do Sul [Bird composition and conservation in eight wetlands of the hydrographic basin of Guaíba lake, State of Rio Grande do Sul, Brazil]. Revista Brasileira de Ornitologia 14 (2): 101-115 [Portuguese with English abstract]. PDf fulltext
 Azpiroz, Adrián B. & Menéndez, José L. (2008): Three new species and novel distributional data for birds in Uruguay. Bulletin of the British Ornithologists' Club 128 (1): 38–56.
 Bencke, Glayson Ariel (2007): Avifauna atual do Rio Grande do Sul, Brasil: aspectos biogeográficos e distribucionais ["The Recent avifauna of Rio Grande do Sul: Biogeographical and distributional aspects"]. Talk held on 2007-JUN-22 at Quaternário do RS: integrando conhecimento, Canoas, Rio Grande do Sul, Brazil. PDF abstract
 Olson, Storrs L.; Irestedt, M.; Ericson, Per G.P. & Fjeldså, Jon (2005): Independent evolution of two Darwinian marsh-dwelling ovenbirds (Furnariidae: Limnornis, Limnoctites). Ornitología Neotropical 16 (3): 347–359. PDF fulltext

External links
 Photo on Flickr

straight-billed reedhaunter
Birds of Argentina
Birds of the South Region
Birds of Uruguay
straight-billed reedhaunter
straight-billed reedhaunter
Taxonomy articles created by Polbot
Birds of the Atlantic Forest